Bioparc Valencia is a  zoo park in Valencia, Spain. It is owned by the City Council of Valencia and designed and managed by Rainforest (a private Spanish company devoted to building and managing zoos). It has a large collection of African fauna.

Located in Valencia's Turia riverbed, most of the animals moved to the new Bioparc facilities from the old city's zoo when the park opened in 2008.

The concept of the zoo, called Zooimersion in Spanish, consists of immersing visitors into the animals' habitat and not vice versa. This is achieved by not using the traditional railings and cages that are common in many zoos, using instead rivers, ponds, streams and rocks to separate  visitors from the animals. Also, great care has been taking in reproducing the eco-systems, including an important collection of African flora.

Exhibits
As of 2022:
Sabana

Aardvark
Abdim's stork
African bush elephant
African pygmy mouse
African rock python
African sacred ibis
Ball python
Banded mongoose
Blesbok
Bush stone-curlew
Cairo spiny mouse
Cape porcupine
Cape teal
Common dwarf mongoose
Common ostrich
Common warthog
Crested guineafowl
Gambian pouched rat
Golden-breasted starling
Grant's zebra
Grey crowned crane
Impala
Kirk's dik-dik
Klipspringer
Lion
Marabou stork
Meerkat
Mhorr gazelle
Naked mole-rat
Purple starling
Rock hyrax
Rothschild's giraffe
Saddle-billed stork
Southern white rhinoceros
Speckled pigeon
Spotted hyena
Superb starling
Thomson's gazelle
Waterbuck
White-cheeked turaco

Selva Ecuatorial

African black duck
African forest buffalo
Black crowned crane
Chimpanzee
De Brazza's monkey
Drill
Dumeril's boa
Dwarf crocodile
Eastern bongo
Emperor scorpion
Gabon talapoin
Leopard
Leopard tortoise
Madagascar day gecko
Madagascar hissing cockroach
Panther chameleon
Pygmy hippopotamus
Red forest duiker
Red river hog
Sitatunga
Spotted-necked otter
White-naped mangabey

Humedales
African spoonbill
Golden mantella
Hippopotamus
Nile crocodile
Pink-backed pelican

Madagascar
Black-and-white ruffed lemur
Fossa
Great white pelican
Greater flamingo
Mongoose lemur
Red-bellied lemur
Red-fronted lemur
Red ruffed lemur
Ring-tailed lemur

References

External links

Zoos in Spain
Buildings and structures in Valencia
Tourist attractions in Valencia
Zoos established in 2008